Creole is a lightweight markup language, aimed at being a common markup language for wikis, enabling and simplifying the transfer of content between different wiki engines.

History
The idea was conceived during a workshop at the 2006 International Symposium on Wikis.  An EBNF grammar and XML interchange format for Creole have also been published. Creole was designed by comparing major wiki engines and using the most common markup for a particular wikitext element. If no commonality was found, the wikitext of the dominant wiki engine MediaWiki was usually chosen.

On July 4, 2007, the version 1.0 (final) of Creole was released, and a two-year development freeze was implemented to allow time for authors of wiki engines to adopt the new markup. Although development to the standard itself is frozen, discussion in the developer community regarding good practices in wiki markup design and about possible additions and changes for future Creole versions continues.

As of 2012, adoption of Creole is limited.  Many wiki systems offer it as an option, but few use it by default and few wiki websites enable this optional feature.

Creole syntax examples
Emphasized text:

//emphasized// (e.g., italics)
 
**strongly emphasized** (e.g., bold)

Lists:

* Bullet list
* Second item
** Sub item

# Numbered list
# Second item
## Sub item

Links:

Link to [[wikipage]]
[[link_address|link text]]

Headings: (closing equals signs are optional)

= Extra-large heading
== Large heading
=== Medium heading
==== Small heading

Linebreaks:

Force\\linebreak

Horizontal Line:

----

Images:

{{Image.jpg|title}}

Tables:

|=  |= table |= header |
| a | table  | row     |
| b | table  | row     |

No markup:
{{{
This text will //not// be **formatted**.
}}}

Support in engines
Creole 1.0 is the default syntax in Bitbucket wikis, which also support some Creole 1.0 additions.

Creole 1.0 is one of the available markup languages for the online educational platform Moodle,
and the UML rendering software PlantUML.

References

External links 

 Creole 1.0 Homepage
 Creole 2.0 Discussion Homepage
 WikiSym 2006 Workshop: Wiki Markup Standard (archived web page)
 Demonstration of a downloadable JavaScript-powered editing tool for Creole 1.0

Lightweight markup languages
Wikis
2007 in computing